Hibbertia lepidota is a species of flowering plant in the family Dilleniaceae and is endemic to northern Australia. It is an erect or trailing shrub with scaly foliage, mostly linear to elliptic leaves, and yellow flowers arranged singly or on small groups in leaf axils, with 15 to 24 stamens arranged in bundles around the two carpels.

Description

Taxonomy
Hibbertia lepidota was first formally described in 1817 by Augustin Pyramus de Candolle in his Regni Vegetabilis Systema Naturale from an unpublished description by Robert Brown. The specific epithet (lepidota) means "covered with scales".

Distribution and habitat
This hibbertia grows in woodland in sandy or gravelly soil in the Central Kimberley, Northern Kimberley and Victoria Bonaparte biogeographic regions of Western Australia, in Top End region of the Northern Territory and in northern Queensland.

Conservation status
Hibbertia lepidota is classified as "least concern" under the Territory Parks and Wildlife Conservation Act 1976 and as "not threatened" by the Western Australian Government Department of Parks and Wildlife.

See also
List of Hibbertia species

References

lepidota
Flora of the Northern Territory
Flora of Queensland
Eudicots of Western Australia
Plants described in 1817
Taxa named by Augustin Pyramus de Candolle